Sidi Khellil is a town and commune in El M'Ghair District, El Oued Province, Algeria. According to the 2008 census it has a population of 6,547, up from 5,524 in 1998, and an annual growth rate of 1.7%.

Geography

Much of the surrounding land is a sandy desert. However, the area between the town (and the railway) and the N3 highway is occupied by an extensive palm plantation.

Climate

Sidi Khellil has a hot desert climate (Köppen climate classification BWh), with very hot summers and mild winters. Rainfall is light and sporadic, and summers are particularly dry.

Transportation

The Biskra-Touggourt train line passes through the town, but there is no station. The main road near the town is the N3 highway, which connect to Biskra to the north and Touggourt to the east.

Education

4.8% of the population has a tertiary education, and another 15.0% has completed secondary education. The overall literacy rate is 76.9%, and is 85.2% among males and 68.2% among females.

Localities
The commune of Sidi Khellil is composed of two localities:

Sidi Khelil
Aïn Cheikh

References

Neighbouring towns and cities

Communes of El Oued Province